The Berg is a 1929 play by the British writer Ernest Raymond. It is based on the sinking of the Titanic liner in 1912.

It premiered at the Q Theatre in Kew Bridge before transferring to His Majesty's Theatre in the West End where it ran for 29 performances between 12 March and 6 April 1929. The original West End cast included Godfrey Tearle, George Relph, Ian Fleming, Edgar Norfolk, Robert Mawdesley, Wallace Geoffrey, Marion Fawcett and Beatrix Thomson.

Film adaptation
It was adapted into a film the same year Atlantic directed by Ewald André Dupont and starring Franklin Dyall, Madeleine Carroll and John Stuart. It was released in four versions, with English-language silent and sound versions as well as French and German-language productions.

References

Bibliography
 Goble, Alan. The Complete Index to Literary Sources in Film. Walter de Gruyter, 1999.
 Wearing, J.P. The London Stage 1920-1929: A Calendar of Productions, Performers, and Personnel. Rowman & Littlefield, 2014.

1929 plays
British plays adapted into films
West End plays